The Young and the Guilty is a 1958 British drama film directed by Peter Cotes and starring Phyllis Calvert, Andrew Ray and Edward Chapman. The film's art direction was by Terence Verity.

Premise
Parents misconstrue the innocent nature of a teenage romance.

Cast
 Phyllis Calvert as Gladys Connor  
 Andrew Ray as Eddie Marshall 
 Edward Chapman as George Connor  
 Janet Munro as Sue Connor  
 Campbell Singer as Joe Marshall  
 Hilda Fenemore as Maude Marshall  
 Jean St. Clair as Mrs. Humbolt, Marshall's Neighbor  
 Sonia Rees as Brenda, Sue's Friend

References

Bibliography
 Chibnall, Steve. J. Lee Thompson. Manchester University Press, 2000.

External links

1958 films
British drama films
British black-and-white films
1958 drama films
1950s English-language films
Films with screenplays by Ted Willis, Baron Willis
1950s British films